Gowanford is a locality in Victoria, Australia, located approximately 37 km from Swan Hill, Victoria.

The Post Office opened on 5 November 1923 as Ganeit, was renamed Gowanford in 1926 and closed in 1962.

References

Towns in Victoria (Australia)
Rural City of Swan Hill